Ronald Alexander Best (3 October 1949 – 14 October 2020) was an Australian politician and Australian rules footballer. He was a National Party member of the Victorian Legislative Council from 1988 to 2002, representing North Western Province.

Career
Best was born in Ivanhoe, Victoria. He was a businessman before entering politics. He was a motel and hotel owner and manager and also owned Golden City Frozen Foods. He was on the board of directors of the Glacier Food Group. He contested the federal seat of Bendigo for the National Party of Australia at the 1987 federal election but was defeated.

In 1988, Best was elected to the Victorian Legislative Council for North Western Province. He was the National Party's spokesman for Housing, Construction and Small Business until 1990 and secretary of the Parliamentary National Party from 1992 to 2002. Following the Coalition's defeat in 1999, he was promoted to the front bench as Shadow Minister for Housing. He retired in 2002.

He married Liberal MP Louise Asher on 10 February 2001.

He is survived by his children from his first marriage, Chris and Elizabeth, and two grandchildren, Ari and Eden.

Football
Best kicked 1919 goals in country football, mostly in the Bendigo Football League. He topped 100 goals in a season on 13 occasions.

1966: 60 Heidelberg, Diamond Valley Football League
1967: 68 Heidelberg
1968: 106 Golden Square, Bendigo Football League
1969: 137 Golden Square
1970: 107 Golden Square
1971: 111 Golden Square
1972: 79 Charlton, North Central Football League
1973: 108 Sandhurst, Bendigo Football League
1974: 135 Sandhurst
1975: 145 Sandhurst
1976: 108 Sandhurst
1977: 25 Sandhurst
1978: 124 Golden Square
1979: 132 Golden Square
1980: 161 Golden Square
1981: 100 Boort, North Central Football League
1982: 25 Boort
1983: 124 Northern United, Bendigo Football League
1984: 64 Northern United

References

1949 births
2020 deaths
National Party of Australia members of the Parliament of Victoria
Members of the Victorian Legislative Council
Golden Square Football Club players
Sandhurst Football Club players
Australian hoteliers
21st-century Australian politicians
Deaths from pancreatic cancer
Deaths from cancer in Australia
Australian rules footballers from Bendigo
People from Ivanhoe, Victoria
Politicians from Melbourne